The Ampoza ground roller (Brachypteracias langrandi) was a species of bird in the ground roller family Brachypteraciidae. It is known only from a single humerus fossil discovered in 1929 in southwest Madagascar. Little is known about the species, but it is suggested that the bird's habitat becoming more arid was a contributing factor in its demise.

Taxonomy and systematics
The genus name is derived from the Ancient Greek brakhupteros, meaning short-winged. The species was named in honour of Olivier Langrand, an ornithologist who had worked in Madagascar.

References

Brachypteracias
Extinct birds of Madagascar
Birds described in 1929
sv:Ampozamarkblåkråka